Leading Edge Air Foils LLC (formerly Leading Edge Air Foils, Inc.), usually called LEAF,  is an American aircraft parts supplier based in Lyons, Wisconsin. It is a US limited liability company.

The company was founded by Bill Raisner in Peyton, Colorado, in the 1980s and claims to be the oldest ultralight aircraft parts supplier. The company specializes in the provision of aircraft parts and aircraft engines and in the past supplied kit aircraft for amateur construction and ready-to-fly aircraft under the US FAR 103 Ultralight Vehicles rules.

The company is owned by Bill Read and Mary Myers and is part of the Wag-Aero group of companies. At one time a subsidiary, Raisner Aircraft Depot (RAD), sold the aircraft kits.

LEAF at one time offered kits and parts for other designer's aircraft, such as Dennis Wiley's Early Bird Jenny, Graham Lee's Circa Reproductions Nieuport, the J & J Ultralights Tukan and Antares MA-32 ultralight trikes, as well as two of Raisner's own designs, the Raisner Graffiti two seat trike and the LEAF Trike single seat trike. The company has long been a Rotax aircraft engine dealer and overhaul facility.

Aircraft

References

External links

Aircraft manufacturers of the United States
Ultralight aircraft
Homebuilt aircraft
Ultralight trikes